St. Leonhard in Passeier is a comune (municipality) in the Passeier Valley in South Tyrol, northern Italy, located about  north of Bolzano.

Geography

Its bordering municipalities are Moos in Passeier, Ratschings, Riffian, St. Martin in Passeier, Sarntal, and Schenna.

Frazioni
The municipality of St. Leonhard in Passeier contains the frazioni (subdivisions, mainly villages and hamlets) Walten (Valtina) and Schweinsteg (Sant'Orsola).

History

Coat-of-arms
The shield is sable a curved pile reversed or. It is the sign of the Lords of Passeier who lived in Jaufenburg Castle in the 13th and 14th centuries. The coat of arms was granted in 1969.

Society

Linguistic distribution
According to the 2011 census, 98.83% of the population speak German, 1.05% Italian and 0.12% Ladin as first language.

Demographic evolution

References

External links

 Homepage of the municipality

Municipalities of South Tyrol